The Battle of Pulo Aura was a minor naval engagement of the Napoleonic Wars, fought on 14 February 1804, in which a large convoy of Honourable East India Company (HEIC) East Indiamen, well-armed merchant ships, intimidated, drove off and chased away a powerful French naval squadron. Although the French force was much stronger than the British convoy, Commodore Nathaniel Dance's aggressive tactics persuaded Contre-Admiral Charles-Alexandre Durand Linois to retire after only a brief exchange of shot. Dance then chased the French warships until his convoy was out of danger, whereupon he resumed his passage toward British India. Linois later claimed that the unescorted British merchant fleet was defended by eight ships of the line, a claim criticised by contemporary officers and later historians.

The battle occurred during an extended commerce raiding operation by a French squadron led by Linois in the ship of the line Marengo. Linois had sailed to the Indian Ocean in 1803 before the declaration of war, under orders to install garrisons in the French and Dutch colonies in the region and to prey on lightly defended British merchant shipping. One of the richest and most significant targets was the "China Fleet", an annual convoy of East Indiamen from China and other Far Eastern ports that carried millions of pounds' worth of trade goods. Although these large vessels were accompanied by numerous smaller merchant ships, news of the outbreak of war had only just arrived in the Pacific and the only warship available to defend the fleet was the small HEIC armed brig Ganges. Dutch informants notified Linois of the fleet's destination and date of departure from Canton while he was anchored at Batavia on Java, and he sailed in search of the convoy on 28 December 1803, eventually discovering it in early February.

Although no warships protected the convoy, Commodore Dance knew that lookouts could, from a distance, mistake a large East Indiaman for a ship of the line. He had his Indiamen formed into a line of battle and raise flags that indicated his fleet included part of the Royal Navy squadron then operating in the Indian Ocean. Although Linois's ships were clearly superior, the British reaction unnerved Linois and he quickly broke off combat. Dance continued his ruse, pursuing Linois for two hours until the body of the convoy was safe. King George III knighted Dance for his courage and various mercantile and patriotic organisations awarded him large sums of money, while both the Emperor Napoleon and Linois's own officers personally castigated the French admiral for his failure to press the attack against a weaker and extremely valuable enemy. Although he remained in command of the squadron for another two years and had some minor success against undefended merchant ships, he suffered a string of defeats and inconclusive engagements against weaker British naval forces. Ironically, Linois was captured at the action of 13 March 1806 by a numerically superior British battle squadron which he had mistaken for a merchant convoy.

Background

During the Napoleonic Wars, the British economy depended on its ability to trade with the British Empire, particularly the valuable colonies in British India. The intercontinental trade was conducted by the governors of India, the Honourable East India Company (HEIC), using their fleet of large, well-armed merchant vessels known as East Indiamen. These ships were of between 500 and 1200 nominal tons burthen (bm) and could carry up to 36 guns for defence against pirates, privateers and small warships. They were not, however, capable under normal circumstances of fighting off an enemy frigate or ship of the line. Their guns were usually of inferior design, and their crew smaller and less well trained than those on a naval ship. The East Indiamen sought to ensure the safety of their cargo and passengers, not defeat enemy warships in battle. Despite these disadvantages, the size of East Indiamen meant that from a distance they appeared quite similar to a small ship of the line, a deception usually augmented by paintwork and dummy cannon. At the Bali Strait Incident of 28 January 1797 an unescorted convoy of East Indiamen had used this similarity to intimidate a powerful French frigate squadron into withdrawing without a fight. In February 1799 an attack by a combined French-Spanish squadron on the assembled convoy at Macau was driven off in the Macau Incident without combat by the small Royal Navy escort squadron.

The East Indiamen would gather at ports in India and the Far East and from there set out for Britain in large convoys, often carrying millions of pounds' worth of trade goods. The journey would usually take six months and the ships would subsequently return carrying troops and passengers to augment the British forces stationed in India. "Country ships", smaller merchant vessels chartered for local trade, sometimes independently from the HEIC, would often join the convoys. To protect their ships from the depredations of pirates, the HEIC also operated its own private navy of small armed vessels. In combination, these ships were an effective deterrent against smaller raiders, but were no match for a professional warship.

Understanding the importance of the Indian Ocean trade and seeking to threaten it from the start of the inevitable war, First Consul Napoleon Bonaparte ordered a squadron to sail for India in March 1803. This force was under the command of Contre-Admiral Charles-Alexandre Durand Linois and consisted of the ship of the line Marengo and three frigates. Linois operated from the island base of Île de France with orders to attack British shipping once war had begun. Sailing initially to Pondicherry in India, Linois had a close encounter with a British squadron under Rear-Admiral Peter Rainier during July, but was at Île de France in August when news arrived that the Napoleonic Wars had started on 16 May. Determined to fortify the French raiding bases in the region, Linois landed troops and supplies at Réunion and Batavia. During the operation he despatched the frigate  to Muscat, captured numerous individual country ships, and burned the British trading post of Bencoolen. On 10 December he anchored at Batavia for the winter. Shortly thereafter, informants passed to Batavia the composition and date of departure of the British "China Fleet", leading Linois to set out to intercept it. The ships carried six months' worth of provisions as Linois had anticipated an extended patrol in the approaches to the Strait of Malacca in the South China Sea.

The China Fleet was a large annual British merchant convoy that gathered at Canton in the Pearl River during the winter before sailing for Britain, via India. As the convoy passed through the East Indies, it was joined by vessels sailing from other European ports in the region on the route to India, until it often numbered dozens of ships. The 1804 fleet departed in late January, and by the time it reached the approaches to the Strait of Malacca it had swelled to include 16 East Indiamen, 11 country ships, a Portuguese merchant ship from Macau and a vessel from Botany Bay in New South Wales. Although the HEIC had provided the small, armed brig Ganges as an escort, this vessel could only dissuade pirates; it could not hope to compete with a French warship. There was no military escort: news of the outbreak of war had reached Canton before reinforcements had arrived from the squadron in India. Spies based in Canton had passed the composition and date of departure of the China Fleet to Linois in Batavia, but the Dutch informants at Canton had also passed on false reports that Royal Navy warships were accompanying the convoy, reports that may have been deliberately placed by British authorities. The convoy was an immensely valuable prize, its cargo of tea, silk and porcelain valued at over £8 million in contemporary values (the equivalent of £ as of ). Also on board were 80 Chinese plants ordered by Sir Joseph Banks for the royal gardens and carried in a specially designed plant room. The HEIC Select Committee in Canton had been very concerned for the safety of the unescorted convoy, and had debated delaying its departure. The various captains had been consulted, including Henry Meriton, who in his ship  had captured a frigate during the action of 4 August 1800, a disastrous French attack on a convoy of East Indiamen off Brazil. Meriton advised that the convoy was powerful enough in both appearance and reality to dissuade any attack. Eventually the Committee decided it could delay the convoy no longer and awarded command to the most experienced captain, Commodore Nathaniel Dance—an officer with over 45 years' service at sea—in the East Indiaman Earl Camden.

Battle
At 08:00 on 14 February 1804, with the island of Pulo Aura within sight to the south-west near the eastern entrance to the Straits of Malacca, the Indiaman Royal George raised a signal describing three sail approaching the convoy from the direction of the island. This was Linois's squadron, which had been cruising in the area for the previous month in anticipation of the convoy's arrival. Dance ordered the brig Ganges and the Indiamen Alfred, Royal George,  and Hope to approach the strange vessels and investigate, rapidly discovering they were enemy warships. By 13:00, Dance had readied his guns and reformed his convoy, with the large Indiamen formed up in line of battle to receive the French attack as if they were warships. During the late afternoon, Linois's squadron fell in behind the slow line of merchant ships and Dance expected an immediate attack, but Linois was cautious and merely observed the convoy, preferring to wait until the following morning before engaging the enemy. Dance made use of the delay to gather the smaller country ships on the opposite side of his line from the French, the brig Ganges shepherding them into position and collecting volunteers from their crews to augment the sailors on board the Indiamen. Linois later excused his delay in attacking the merchant convoy by citing the need for caution:

At dawn on 15 February, both the British and the French raised their colours. Dance hoped to persuade Linois that his ships included some fully armed warships and he therefore ordered the brig Ganges and the four lead ships to hoist blue ensigns, while the rest of the convoy raised red ensigns. By the system of national flags then in use in British ships, this implied that the ships with blue ensigns were warships attached to the squadron of Admiral Rainier, while the others were merchant ships under their protection. Dance was unknowingly assisted by the information that had reached Linois at Batavia, which claimed that there were 23 merchant ships and the brig in the convoy. Dance had collected six additional ships during his journey, and the identity of these were unknown to the French, who assumed that at least some of the unidentified vessels must be warships, particularly as several vessels had been recently painted at Canton to resemble ships of the line.

At 09:00 Linois was still only observing the convoy, reluctant to attack until he could be sure of the nature of his opponents. Dance responded to the reprieve by reforming the line of battle into sailing formation to increase his convoy's speed with the intention of reaching the Straits ahead of Linois. With the convoy a less intimidating target, Linois began to slowly approach the British ships. By 13:00 it was clear that Linois's faster ships were in danger of isolating the rear of the convoy, and Dance ordered his lead ships to tack and come about so they would cross in front of the French squadron. The British successfully executed the manoeuvre, and at 13:15 Linois opened fire on the lead ship—Royal George—under the command of John Fam Timmins. The Royal George and the next four ships in line, the Indiaman Ganges, Dance's Earl Camden, the Warley and the Alfred, all returned fire, Ganges initially attacking Royal George in error. Captain James Prendergrass in Hope, the next in line, was so eager to join the battle that he misjudged his speed and collided with Warley, the ships falling back as their crews worked to separate their rigging. Shots were then exchanged at long range for 43 minutes, neither side inflicting severe damage.

Royal George had a sailor named Hugh Watt killed, another man wounded, and suffered some damage to her hull. None of the other British ships or any of the French reported anything worse than superficial damage in the engagement. At 14:00, Linois abandoned the action and ordered his squadron to haul away with the wind and sail eastwards, away from the convoy, under all sail. Determined to maintain the pretence of the presence of warships, Dance ordered the ships flying naval ensigns, including his flagship Earl Camden, to chase the French. None of the merchant ships could match the French speed, but an attempt at a chase would hopefully dissuade the French from returning. For two hours, Dance's squadron followed Linois, Hope coming close to catching Aventurier but ultimately unable to overtake the brig. At 16:00, Dance decided to gather his scattered ships and return to his former heading rather than risk attack from other raiders or lose sight of his convoy in the darkness. By 20:00, the entire British convoy had anchored at the entrance to the Straits of Malacca. On 28 February, the British ships of the line  and  joined them in the Strait and conducted them safely to Saint Helena in the South Atlantic.

There  escorted the convoy to England. The convoy returned to England without further incident.

Linois's squadron reached Batavia several days after the action without encountering any British ships. He was there joined by Atalante and, after taking on supplies, made sail for Île de France, arriving on 2 April. The Dutch brig Aventurier was left at Batavia and remained there until a raid on the port by a British force in November 1806, when it was destroyed. The French admiral later attempted to explain his conduct during the engagement:

Orders of battle

Aftermath
Nathaniel Dance and his fellow captains were highly praised in the aftermath of the battle: in saving the convoy they had prevented both the HEIC and Lloyd's of London from likely financial ruin, the repercussions of which would have had profound effects across the British Empire. The various commanders and their crews were presented with a £50,000 prize fund to be divided among them, and the Lloyd's Patriotic Fund and other national and mercantile institutions made a series of awards of ceremonial swords, silver plate and monetary gifts to individual officers. Lloyd's Patriotic Fund gave each captain a sword worth £50, and one to Royal Navy Lieutenant Robert Merrick Fowler, travelling as a passenger on Earl Camden, and one worth £100 to Nathaniel Dance.

Dance was specifically rewarded, receiving royal recognition when he was made a Knight Bachelor by King George III. He was also personally presented with the sum of £5,000 by the Bombay Insurance Company and an additional £500 a year for life by the HEIC. Dance immediately retired from the sea to Enfield Town, where he died in 1827. He refused to take full credit for the survival of the convoy, writing in reply to the award from the Bombay Insurance Company:

This party—carried aboard Ganges, Royal George and Earl Camden—volunteered to assist the gun teams aboard their ships and Dance specifically thanked them in his account of the action. One was Lieutenant Robert Merrick Fowler, the former commander of Porpoise, who distinguished himself in a variety of capacities during the engagement.

Some of the party had influential careers in the Navy, including the naval architect James Inman, who sailed on Warley, and John Franklin, who later became a polar explorer. Also aboard was Indian businessman Jamsetjee Jeejebhoy returning from the second of his five voyages to China.

Linois continued his raiding, achieving some success against individual sailing ships, but failing to press successfully his numerical superiority against British naval forces; most notably at the Battle of Vizagapatam on 15 September 1804 and the action of 6 August 1805. Ironically, Linois was eventually captured at the action of 13 March 1806 after mistaking a squadron of British ships of the line for a merchant convoy in the mid-Atlantic. He also sought to defend his behaviour off Pulo Aura with the claim that the British convoy was protected by as many as eight ships of the line, and that he had performed heroically in saving his squadron from this overwhelming force. Subsequent historians have ridiculed this latter statement: William James wryly commented in his account of the action, written in 1827, that "it would be uncharitable to call into question the courage of Rear-admiral Linois" and William Laird Clowes said in 1900 that "his timidity and want of enterprise threw away a great opportunity". Nicholas Rodger, writing in 2004, was even more critical, insisting that "his [Linois's] officers do not seem to have been fooled, and it is extremely difficult to believe that he was." He goes on to suggest that no experienced seaman could possibly have mistaken a poorly manned and poorly trained merchant crew for the crew of a real Royal Navy ship of the line, concluding that "Linois had thrown away a prize worth at least £8 million through mere timidity". The most scathing criticism of Linois's conduct came from Napoleon himself, who wrote to Minister of Marine Denis Decrès on the subject, stating:

See also
Frederick Marryat's 1832 novel Newton Forster
Patrick O'Brian's 1973 novel HMS Surprise

Notes

Citations

References

External links
 

Naval battles of the Napoleonic Wars
Conflicts in 1804
Naval battles involving France
Naval battles involving the United Kingdom
Naval battles involving the Batavian Republic
Naval battles involving the British East India Company
Strait of Malacca
February 1804 events